Year 967 (CMLXVII) was a common year starting on Tuesday (link will display the full calendar) of the Julian calendar.

Events 
 By place 

 Europe 
 Spring – Emperor Otto I (the Great) calls for a council at Rome, to present the new government under Pope John XIII. He asserts his rights in the city, and insists on the occasional presence of an imperial judge, alongside the papal court. The era of Roman independence is over. Grado becomes the patriarchal and metropolitan church of the whole of the Veneto.
 Otto I goes on a tour of the Lombard duchies of southern Italy. In Capua he grants Pandulf I (Ironhead) the vacant Duchy of Spoleto and Camerino and charges him with prosecuting the war against the Byzantine Empire. In Benevento, Otto receives the homage of Pandulf's brother and co-ruler Landulf III. In Salerno he receives also the support of Gisulf I.
 Otto I dispatches an imperial delegation (led by a Venetian named Domenico) to Constantinople with assurances of his friendship and a request for Princess Theophano (a daughter of the late Emperor Romanos II) for his 12-year-old son Otto II. As dowry Otto demands the Byzantine holdings in southern Italy.
 Summer – Sviatoslav I, Grand Prince of Kiev, defeats Bulgar forces in the Balkans at the behest of Emperor Nikephoros II (who pays him 1,500 pounds of gold to invade the Bulgarian Empire). 
 The imperial delegation arrives in Macedonia, but goes nowhere with Nikephoros II. Far from offering Byzantine Italy as dowry for Theophano, Nikephoros refuses to accept the claims of Otto I.
 Otto I renews the imperial treaty with Pietro IV Candiano, doge of Venice. He grants him commercial privileges, and protection for Venetian citizens (also the possessions of Venetian bishops). 
 Winter – Otto I returns to Rome. On Christmas day, John XIII crowns Otto II as co-emperor of the Holy Roman Empire. Although Otto II is nominated as co-ruler, he exercises no real authority.
 Olaf Tryggvason flees Norway with his mother, only to be attacked by Estonian Vikings (approximate date).

 Arabian Empire 
 Emir Nasir al-Dawla is deposed and imprisoned at Mosul after a 32-year reign by his son Abu Taghlib, the de facto governor, and supporters. He becomes the new ruler of the Emirate of Mosul.
 The Fatimid general Jawhar al-Siqilli launches a military campaign in the west of the Maghreb. He resumes his expansion, together with the Zirids, and conquers Fez (modern-day Morocco).

 Japan 
 July 5 – Emperor Murakami dies after a 21-year reign. He is succeeded by his 17-year-old son Reizei, who is insane and becomes the 63rd emperor of Japan.

 By topic 

 Religion 
 Otto I completes and dedicates a new cathedral at Magdeburg in Saxony. Like other imperial churches of the period, it includes a westwork – a structure attached to the entrance wall and outfitted with galleries. Otto makes Magdeburg a base for missionary efforts to convert the Slavs to the east. The patron saint of the city is Mauritius, who, as a military leader fighting for Christianity against pagan armies, shares affinities with Otto himself.
 Re-foundation of Romsey Abbey in Hampshire by King Edgar I (the Peaceful). He appoints Merewenna, an English noblewoman, as abbess who becomes a foster mother to Princess Ælfflæd (a step-daughter of Edgar).
 April 22 – The Cambodian temple Banteay Srei is consecrated and dedicated to the Hindu god Shiva.

Births 
 December 7 – Abū-Sa'īd Abul-Khayr, Persian Sufi poet (d. 1049)
 Bolesław I (the Brave), king of Poland (d. 1025)
 Gothelo I, duke of Lorraine (approximate date)
 Lin Bu, Chinese poet and calligrapher (d. 1028)
 Vahram Pahlavouni, prince of Bjni (Armenia) (d. 1045)
 Walter of Speyer, German bishop and poet (d. 1027)

Deaths 
 February 9 – Sayf al-Dawla, Hamdanid emir (b. 916)
 April 8 – Mu'izz al-Dawla, Buyid emir (b. 915)
 May 10 – Renaud of Roucy, Viking nobleman 
 July 5 – Murakami, emperor of Japan (b. 926)
 September 22 – Wichmann II, Frankish nobleman
 October 20 – Li Yixing, Chinese governor
 Abu al-Faraj al-Isfahani, Umayyad historian (b. 897)
 Abu 'Ali Muhammad ibn Ilyas, Ilyasid emir
 Aleramo di Savona, marquess of Montferrat
 Al-Qabisi, Hamdanid astrologer (approximate date)
 Ashot III, prince of Taron (approximate date)
 Boleslaus I (the Cruel), duke of Bohemia (or 972)
 Dub mac Maíl Coluīm, king of Alba (Scotland)
 Fergal ua Ruairc, king of Connacht (Ireland)
 Hugh II (the Kind), lord of Lusignan
 Krishna III, ruler of the Rashtrakuta Dynasty
 Li Cheng, Chinese painter (b. 919)
 Robert of Vermandois, Frankish nobleman (or 968)
 Vushmgir, Ziyarid emir (approximate date)
 Wahsudan ibn Muhammad, Sallarid emir
 Yan Xu, Chinese chancellor (b. 910)

References